Nenad Kočović (born 20 February 1995) is a Serbian football defender who plays for Kolubara.

Club career
Born in Kragujevac, Kočović had played for several clubs during his youth career before he joined Vojvodina, where he spent the rest of youth career. He was licensed for the first team of the club in summer 2014, and was sitting on the bench in the 2nd leg match against Trenčín in UEFA Europa League qualifications. He was loaned to ČSK Čelarevo on dual registration for the first half-season. Later he extended his loan until the end of 2014–15 season, helping his team to make promotion in the Serbian First League. In summer 2015, Kočović terminated a contract with Vojvodina, and moved to Proleter Novi Sad for the 2015–16 Serbian First League season. Playing for Proleter, Kočović was the most standard player in squad with 28 matches scoring 2 goals, one in each half-season. During the winter break off-season, he was with Rad, but failed to sign a contract after two clubs did not make a deal. Kočović left the club after the end of season. In summer 2016, Kočović joined Serbian SuperLiga club Borac Čačak and signed contract until 2019. Making 7 appearances in all competitions, Kočović sued the club for unpaid wages in 2017, and got the contract termination to the detriment of the club and left Borac after the end of 2016–17 season.

Career statistics

Honours
Proleter Novi Sad
Serbian First League: 2017–18

References

External links
 Nenad Kočović stats at utakmica.rs 
 
 
 

1995 births
Living people
Sportspeople from Kragujevac
Association football defenders
Serbian footballers
FK Vojvodina players
FK ČSK Čelarevo players
FK Proleter Novi Sad players
FK Borac Čačak players
FK Loznica players
FK Inđija players
FK Kabel players
FK Kolubara players
Serbian First League players
Serbian SuperLiga players